Kalloori Vinoth is an Indian actor who has appeared in Tamil language films.

Career 
After appearing in small supporting roles and making his debut in Kalloori (2007), he made his breakthrough as an actor with a supporting role in Balaji Mohan's Maari (2015). Vinoth played an important role in Raja Ranguski (2018). His comedic role in the film garnered acclaim from critics with one critic stating that "Kalloori Vinoth gets a few funny one-liners" and another stated that "The comedy one-liners of Kalloori Vinoth is also enjoyable in many places". He reprised his role from Maari in the sequel titled Maari 2 along with Dhanush and Robo Shankar.

Filmography 

2007, Kalloori
2012, Kalakalappu
2013, Vizha
2013, Sundattam
2015, Maari
2017, Enakku Vaaitha Adimaigal
2018, Sketch
2018, Raja Ranguski
2018, Maari 2
2019, Ongala Podanum Sir
2019, Sangathamizhan
2019, Nisha 
2020, Pizhai 
2020, Trip 
2021, Papillon
2021, Gaadi Ulla Body
2021, Cindrella 
2022, Therkathi Veeran 
2022, Putham Pudhu Kaalai Vidiyaadhaa (2022)

References

External links 

Indian male film actors
Male actors in Tamil cinema
Living people
21st-century Indian male actors
Year of birth missing (living people)
Place of birth missing (living people)